Brian Griffiths (born 21 November 1933) is a Welsh former professional footballer.

Playing career
Griffiths helped Ruabon Grammar School win the Denbighshire Schools' Championship before going on to spend time with Ruabon Youth Club and Ruabon Athletic. He went on to join Blackpool on amateur terms but he rejected the opportunity to sign as a professional due to working for MANWEB. During this period he was capped four times by Wales Schoolboys, scoring a hat-trick against Republic of Ireland in a 4–3 win.

In the summer of 1952, Griffiths joined Wrexham as an amateur, signing a part-time contract in May 1953. He remained part-time throughout his career despite pressure from club officials to become a full-time player. He scored 11 times in just 22 league appearances for Wrexham, including a hat-trick against Darlington, before moving to local rivals Chester in 1958, where he was restricted to just two league outings. After leaving Chester he dropped outside The Football League, spending time with Caernarfon Town, Holywell Town and Ludlow Town.

Away from football, Griffiths worked for MANWEB until he retired in 1991, with his other duties including being a member of Rhuddlan Golf Club and a church warden and treasurer at Rhuddlan Parish Church.

References

1933 births
Living people
Footballers from Wrexham
Welsh footballers
English Football League players
Association football forwards
Blackpool F.C. players
Wrexham A.F.C. players
Chester City F.C. players
Caernarfon Town F.C. players
Holywell Town F.C. players
People educated at Ruabon Grammar School